Statistics of the USFSA Football Championship in the 1906 season.

Tournament

First round
 Stade Universitaire Caennais - US Le Mans (Le Mans forfeited)
 US Cognaçaise - Stade Bordelais UC

Second round  
Stade Rémois 3-1 Stade Lorrain 
Stade Bordelais UC 1-5 Stade Olympique des Étudiants Toulousains
 Stade Universitaire Caennais 2-1 Stade rennais
 Lyon Olympique 2-2 Olympique de Marseille  
Olympique de Marseille - Lyon Olympique  
Amiens AC - Stade ardennais (Sedan forfeited)

Quarterfinals 
Stade Rémois 4-1 Amiens AC
RC Roubaix 6-2 Le Havre AC
Stade Olympique des Étudiants Toulousains 4-1 Olympique de Marseille
 Stade Universitaire Caennais 0-8 CA Paris

Semifinals  
 Stade Olympique des Étudiants Toulousains 1-2 CA Paris  
RC Roubaix 7-0 Stade Rémois

Final  
RC Roubaix 4-1 CA Paris

References
RSSF

USFSA Football Championship
1
France